The Cucurbitales are an order of flowering plants, included in the rosid group of dicotyledons  with a cosmopolitan distribution, particularly diverse in the tropics. The order includes shrubs and trees, together with many herbs and climbers. One major characteristic of the Cucurbitales is the presence of unisexual flowers, mostly pentacyclic, with thick pointed petals (whenever present). The pollination is usually performed by insects, but wind pollination is also present (in Coriariaceae and Datiscaceae).

The order consists of roughly 2600 species in eight families. The largest families are Begoniaceae (begonia family) with around 1500 species and Cucurbitaceae (gourd family) with around 900 species. These two families include the only economically important plants. Specifically, the Cucurbitaceae (gourd family) include some food species, such as squash, pumpkin (both from Cucurbita), watermelon (Citrullus vulgaris), and cucumber and melons  (Cucumis). The Begoniaceae are known for their horticultural species, of which there are over 130 with many more varieties.

The anthophytes are a grouping of plant taxa bearing flower-like reproductive structures. They were formerly thought to be a clade comprising plants bearing flower-like structures.  The group contained the angiosperms - the extant flowering plants, such as roses and grasses - as well as the Gnetales and the extinct Bennettitales.

23,420 species of vascular plant have been recorded in South Africa, making it the sixth most species-rich country in the world and the most species-rich country on the African continent. Of these, 153 species are considered to be threatened. Nine biomes have been described in South Africa: Fynbos, Succulent Karoo, desert, Nama Karoo, grassland, savanna, Albany thickets, the Indian Ocean coastal belt, and forests.

The 2018 South African National Biodiversity Institute's National Biodiversity Assessment plant checklist lists 35,130 taxa in the phyla Anthocerotophyta (hornworts (6)), Anthophyta (flowering plants (33534)), Bryophyta (mosses (685)), Cycadophyta (cycads (42)), Lycopodiophyta (Lycophytes(45)), Marchantiophyta (liverworts (376)), Pinophyta (conifers (33)), and Pteridophyta (cryptogams (408)).

Two families are represented in the literature. Listed taxa include species, subspecies, varieties, and forms as recorded, some of which have subsequently been allocated to other taxa as synonyms, in which cases the accepted taxon is appended to the listing. Multiple entries under alternative names reflect taxonomic revision over time.

Begoniaceae
Family: Begoniaceae,

Begonia
Genus Begonia:
 Begonia cucullata Willd. not indigenous, naturalised
 Begonia dregei Otto & A.Dietr. endemic
 Begonia geranioides Hook.f. endemic
 Begonia hirtella Link, not indigenous, naturalised
 Begonia homonyma Steud. endemic
 Begonia sonderiana Irmsch. indigenous
 Begonia sonderiana Irmsch. var. transgrediens Irmsch. accepted as Begonia sonderiana Irmsch. present
 Begonia sutherlandii Hook.f. indigenous
 Begonia sutherlandii Hook.f. subsp. sutherlandii,  indigenous

Cucurbitaceae
 Family: Cucurbitaceae,

Acanthosicyos
Genus Acanthosicyos:
 Acanthosicyos horridus Welw. ex Hook.f. indigenous
 Acanthosicyos naudinianus (Sond.) C.Jeffrey, indigenous

Citrullus
Genus Citrullus:
 Citrullus ecirrhosus Cogn. indigenous
 Citrullus lanatus (Thunb.) Matsum. & Nakai, indigenous

Coccinia
Genus Coccinia:
 Coccinia adoensis (A.Rich.) Cogn. indigenous
 Coccinia hirtella Cogn. indigenous
 Coccinia mackenii Naudin ex C.Huber, indigenous
 Coccinia palmata (Sond.) Cogn. accepted as Coccinia mackenii Naudin ex C.Huber, present
 Coccinia quinqueloba (Thunb.) Cogn. endemic
 Coccinia rehmannii Cogn. indigenous
 Coccinia sessilifolia (Sond.) Cogn. indigenous
 Coccinia variifolia A.Meeuse, endemic

Corallocarpus
Genus Corallocarpus:
 Corallocarpus bainesii (Hook.f.) A.Meeuse, indigenous
 Corallocarpus dissectus Cogn. indigenous
 Corallocarpus schinzii Cogn. indigenous
 Corallocarpus triangularis Cogn. indigenous

Ctenolepis
Genus Ctenolepis:
 Ctenolepis cerasiformis (Stocks) Hook.f. indigenous

Cucumella
Genus Cucumella:
 Cucumella aspera (Cogn.) C.Jeffrey, accepted as Cucumis asper Cogn. 
 Cucumella bryoniifolia (Merxm.) C.Jeffrey, accepted as Cucumis bryoniifolius (Merxm.) Ghebret. & Thulin, indigenous
 Cucumella cinerea (Cogn.) C.Jeffrey, accepted as Cucumis cinereus (Cogn.) Ghebret. & Thulin, indigenous
 Cucumella clavipetiolata J.H.Kirkbr. accepted as Cucumis clavipetiolatus (J.H.Kirkbr.) Ghebret. & Thulin

Cucumis
Genus Cucumis:
 Cucumis africanus L.f. indigenous
 Cucumis anguria L. indigenous
 Cucumis anguria L. var. longaculeatus J.H.Kirkbr. indigenous
 Cucumis ficifolius A.Rich., indigenous
 Cucumis heptadactylus Naudin, endemic
 Cucumis hirsutus Sond. indigenous
 Cucumis humifructus Stent, indigenous
 Cucumis kalahariensis A.Meeuse, indigenous
 Cucumis maderaspatanus L. indigenous
 Cucumis meeusei C.Jeffrey, indigenous
 Cucumis melo L. indigenous
 Cucumis melo L. subsp. agrestis (Naudin) Pangalo, indigenous
 Cucumis melo L. subsp. melo,  indigenous
 Cucumis metuliferus E.Mey. ex Naudin, indigenous
 Cucumis myriocarpus Naudin, indigenous
 Cucumis myriocarpus Naudin subsp. leptodermis (Schweick.) C.Jeffrey & P.Halliday, indigenous
 Cucumis myriocarpus Naudin subsp. myriocarpus,  indigenous
 Cucumis oreosyce H.Schaef. indigenous
 Cucumis prophetarum L., indigenous
 Cucumis quintanilhae R.Fern. & A.Fern. indigenous
 Cucumis rigidus E.Mey. ex Sond. indigenous
 Cucumis sagittatus Peyr. indigenous
 Cucumis zeyheri Sond. indigenous

Diplocyclos
Genus Diplocyclos:
 Diplocyclos palmatus (L.) C.Jeffrey, not indigenous, naturalised, invasive

Gerrardanthus
Genus Gerrardanthus:
 Gerrardanthus macrorhizus Harv. ex Hook.f. indigenous
 Gerrardanthus tomentosus Hook.f. endemic

Kedrostis
Genus Kedrostis:
 Kedrostis africana (L.) Cogn. indigenous
 Kedrostis capensis (Sond.) A.Meeuse, indigenous
 Kedrostis crassirostrata Bremek. indigenous
 Kedrostis foetidissima (Jacq.) Cogn. indigenous
 Kedrostis hirtella (Naudin) Cogn. accepted as Kedrostis leloja (Forssk.) C.Jeffrey, indigenous
 Kedrostis leloja (Forssk.) C.Jeffrey, indigenous
 Kedrostis limpompensis C.Jeffrey, accepted as Kedrostis limpopoensis C.Jeffrey, present
 Kedrostis limpopoensis C.Jeffrey, indigenous
 Kedrostis nana (Lam.) Cogn. indigenous
 Kedrostis nana (Lam.) Cogn. var. nana,  endemic
 Kedrostis nana (Lam.) Cogn. var. schlechteri (Cogn.) A.Meeuse, endemic
 Kedrostis nana (Lam.) Cogn. var. zeyheri (Schrad.) A.Meeuse, endemic
 Kedrostis psammophylla Bruyns, endemic

Lagenaria
Genus Lagenaria:
 Lagenaria siceraria (Molina) Standl. indigenous
 Lagenaria sphaerica (Sond.) Naudin, indigenous

Momordica
Genus Momordica:
 Momordica balsamina L. indigenous
 Momordica boivinii Baill. indigenous
 Momordica cardiospermoides Klotzsch, indigenous
 Momordica charantia L. not indigenous, naturalised
 Momordica foetida Schumach. indigenous
 Momordica repens Bremek. indigenous

Mukia
Genus Mukia:
 Mukia maderaspatana (L.) M.Roem. accepted as Cucumis maderaspatanus L. indigenous

Oreosyce
Genus Oreosyce:
 Oreosyce africana Hook.f. accepted as Cucumis oreosyce H.Schaef. indigenous

Peponium
Genus Peponium:
 Peponium caledonicum (Sond.) Engl. indigenous
 Peponium mackenii (Naudin) Engl. endemic

Pilogyne
Genus Pilogyne:
 Pilogyne marlothii (Cogn.) W.J.de Wilde & Duyfjes, indigenous
 Pilogyne parvifolia (Cogn.) W.J.de Wilde & Duyfjes, indigenous

Trochomeria
Genus Trochomeria:
 Trochomeria debilis (Sond.) Hook.f. indigenous
 Trochomeria hookeri Harv. indigenous
 Trochomeria macrocarpa (Sond.) Hook.f. indigenous
 Trochomeria macrocarpa (Sond.) Hook.f. subsp. macrocarpa,  indigenous
 Trochomeria sagittata (Harv. ex Sond.) Cogn. indigenous

Zehneria
Genus Zehneria:
 Zehneria marlothii (Cogn.) R.Fern. & A.Fern. accepted as Pilogyne marlothii (Cogn.) W.J.de Wilde & Duyfjes, indigenous
 Zehneria parvifolia (Cogn.) J.H.Ross, accepted as Pilogyne parvifolia (Cogn.) W.J.de Wilde & Duyfjes, indigenous
 Zehneria scabra (L.f.) Sond. subsp. scabra,  accepted as Pilogyne scabra (L.f.) W.J.de Wilde & Duyfjes, indigenous

References

South African plant biodiversity lists
Cucurbitales